Gabriela Dabrowski and Xu Yifan were the defending champions, but lost in the first round to Elise Mertens and Demi Schuurs.

Ashleigh Barty and CoCo Vandeweghe won the title, defeating Barbora Krejčíková and Kateřina Siniaková in the final, 6–2, 6–1.

Seeds

Draw

Finals

Top half

Bottom half

External links
 Main Draw

Miami Open - Women's Doubles
2018 Miami Open